James John Stewart Imlach (6 January 1932 – 7 October 2001) was a Scottish professional footballer who played as a left-winger for numerous clubs in England. He is best known today as the subject of an award-winning biography by his son, Gary Imlach, titled My Father and Other Working Class Football Heroes. Another son, Mike Imlach, had a brief professional career in the 1980s.

Club career

Early career
Imlach was born in the fishing town of Lossiemouth, on the Moray Firth coast. He became the first man in five generations of the family name who chose not to become a fisherman. He started his professional football career with Highland League club Lossiemouth F.C.  He then moved south at the age of 20.

Bury paid £150 for his services in May 1952. He stayed at Gigg Lane for two seasons.

Derby County
He joined Derby County in a player-exchange deal. However the "Rams" were relegated out of the Second Division at the end of the 1954–55 season. Imlach had a falling out with the club over a housing dispute as his promised accommodation was given to new signing John Buchanan. He was retained by the club on reduced wages.

Nottingham Forest
He joined Nottingham Forest for £5,000 in 1955. He was part of the City Ground club's 1959 FA Cup winning team providing the pass or assist for the first goal in the final by Roy Dwight. Forest were 2-0 up after 14 minutes. Luton Town hit back midway through the second half after Dwight broke his leg in the 33rd minute. Forest had further personnel issues when cramping reduced Bill Whare to little more than a hobbling spectator. Imlach helped Forest protect their 2–1 lead to lift the trophy at Wembley.

Later career
He moved to the vanquished cup final opponents Luton Town, for £8,000 in 1960. He then wound down his career with short spells at Coventry City (1960–62), Crystal Palace (1962–64), Dover (1964–65), Chelmsford City (1965–66) and Crystal Palace again (1966–67).

International career
The first Nottingham Forest player ever to be selected by Scotland, Imlach made four appearances for the Scottish national side in 1958, against Hungary, Poland, Yugoslavia and France, the latter two games taking place at the 1958 FIFA World Cup finals in Sweden. However, prior to the 1970s, caps were only issued to those who appeared in matches against the other home countries, so Imlach never received a cap.

In 2005, Imlach's son Gary was at the forefront of a popular campaign to have Imlach and others, such as Eddie Turnbull, retrospectively awarded caps. After concerted public pressure, the Scottish Football Association bowed to the popular will in 2006 and officially capped all players affected by the previous rule.

Coaching career
When Imlach stopped playing he became a trainer and spent the next 12 years coaching at Notts County, Everton, Blackpool and Bury. His time with Everton was the longest spell, Imlach acting as first assistant trainer then first team trainer for the "Toffees" between 1969 and 1976.

In 2009 a street of new houses in his home town of Lossiemouth – Imlach Way – was named in his honour.

Honours
Nottingham Forest
 FA Cup: 1959

Notes

References

External links
 

1932 births
2001 deaths
People from Lossiemouth
Sportspeople from Moray
Scottish footballers
Scotland international footballers
Association football wingers
Lossiemouth F.C. players
Bury F.C. players
Derby County F.C. players
Nottingham Forest F.C. players
Luton Town F.C. players
Coventry City F.C. players
Crystal Palace F.C. players
Dover F.C. players
Chelmsford City F.C. players
English Football League players
1958 FIFA World Cup players
Blackpool F.C. non-playing staff
Notts County F.C. non-playing staff
Everton F.C. non-playing staff
Highland Football League players
FA Cup Final players